Dazhu gansi is a specialty dish of Huaiyang cuisine. Dried tofu is sliced into matchsticks and served in chicken stock. Many other ingredients can be added to the tofu. As tofu does not have much flavor, the chef is challenged to produce knifework of great precision (a hallmark of Huaiyang cuisine) and a broth of the highest quality. It is said to have been created in Yangzhou for the Qianlong emperor.

References

Jiangsu cuisine
Chinese cuisine
Tofu dishes
Chinese soups